The Canada Infrastructure Bank (CIB) is a federal Crown Corporation of Canada tasked with financially supporting revenue-generating infrastructure projects that are "in the public interest" through public-private partnerships.

The bank was set up in coordination with equity investors such as BlackRock and Canada's largest pension funds. The CIB was officially established in June 2017 and its inaugural chairperson was former Royal Bank of Canada CAO and CFO Janice Fukakusa. The CIB functionally replaced PPP Canada, which was dismantled in 2018.

The CIB's stated purpose is to support the government of Canada's official infrastructure priorities, such as investing in public transit, trade and transportation, and green infrastructure.

The bank's role and operations were criticized by a wide variety of associations, scholars and opposition parties from its early beginnings. Critics decried the CIB's lack of transparency, poor efficiency and high costs. After nearly five years of operation, no infrastructure projects financed through the CIB have yet been completed. In May 2022, the House of Commons transport committee recommended that the bank be abolished.

History
The Canada Infrastructure Bank was announced by the Finance Minister, Bill Morneau, during the 2016 fall economic update. This was based on a campaign promise made by the Liberal Party during the 2015 Canadian federal election. It was officially established in June 2017 when the Canada Infrastructure Bank Act received royal assent. The bank's website used to state that it "was established in response to a market gap between government-funded and privately funded infrastructure projects". Some speculated that the bank's creation was a way for the government to sidestep the Committee on Monetary and Economic Reform's lawsuit.

A Canadian investment banker working for Bank of America Merrill Lynch helped design and set up the Canada Infrastructure Bank. In November 2016, the government held high-level meetings concerning the bank's structure behind closed doors with private consultants from Mckinsey, as well as major equity investors such as BlackRock and Canada's largest pension funds.

The creation of the Canada Infrastructure Bank coincides with the dissolution of PPP Canada and the PPP Canada fund, which were created under Prime Minister Stephen Harper to fund infrastructure projects with public-private partnerships.

Janice Fukakusa was appointed as the CIB's inaugural chairperson of the board of directors in July 2017. She was joined in May 2018 by Pierre Lavallée, the CIB's first President, Chief Financial Officer (CFO) and chief executive officer (CEO). 

The first few years of the bank's existence were mired in controversy related to the fact that some of its main projects would mainly be funded by user fees. Both the Conservative Party and the New Democratic Party vowed to wind down the bank if elected. Amid widespread criticism of the bank's operations, both Fukakusa and Lavalée resigned from their position in April 2020. Upon his resignation, Lavallée was awarded a bonus worth $720,000, or 120% of his annual salary. In October 2020, he was replaced by former McKinsey & Company partner Ehren Cory.

In January 2021, Tamara Vrooman was selected as the new chair of the bank. In July, Vrooman reported that the CIB "has funded and financed about $13.9 billion in projects, over 70 per cent of those in the last six months alone, with almost 70 per cent of that financing coming from the private sector."

The House of Commons transport committee oversaw a review of the bank, and held hearing on its operation in 2021. In May 2022, the committee released a report based on these findings with one recommendation: "That the Government of Canada abolish the Canada Infrastructure Bank".

Mandate 
The 2017 Canada Infrastructure Bank Act sets out the corporation's mandate to invest, and seek to attract investment from private-sector investors and institutional investors, in revenue-generating infrastructure projects that are "in the public interest".

The CIB uses financial instruments including loans, equity, and, where appropriate, loan guarantees to deliver federal support to projects to make them commercially viable. The CIB provides financing and investment using a combination of these instruments depending on a project's unique characteristics. The model is to use private and institutional capital to finance projects up front, while the public sector and users fund the private return on investment over time.

The Government of Canada sets the high-level policy priorities for the CIB, including projects that:

support the government's current priorities to invest in public transit, trade and transportation, and green infrastructure;
contribute to the objectives of the Investing in Canada Plan and the Pan-Canadian Framework on Clean Growth and Climate Change; and
are generally eligible for cost sharing under federal infrastructure support programs.

Consideration is given to potential projects appropriate for the new partnership- and revenue-based funding model.

The CIB reports to Parliament through the Minister of Infrastructure and Communities.

Funding
The Canadian Parliament has authorized appropriations of $CDN35 billion covering the eleven-year period that ends in FY 2027–2028. This includes $CDN15 billion for the fiscal framework. This financial support is not earmarked for projects directly, but to  "mobilize private investment" for those projects that would otherwise have no private investment. This may be in the form of "financial instruments" or "loans, equity investments, and loan guarantees."

User fees 
CIB projects are paid through user fees. In a September 2017 keynote address to the Canadian council for public-private partnerships, CIV chair Janice Fukakusa affirmed that infrastructure projects financed through the CIB would be outside the public balance sheet. She then stated that projects could generate revenues "in many different forms, including fees, tolls, fares, tariffs, and mechanisms based on appreciating land value". In a 2018 interview with B2B magazine IPE Real Assets, CIB CEO Pierre Lavallée clarified that "when it is operational, users will fund the bulk of the operations".

Public-private partnerships 

Since its inception, the CIB has promoted Public-private partnerships for infrastructure procurement. In July 2022, six month after becoming chairperson of the CIB, Tamara Vrooman told the Toronto Region Board of Trade that she was a "big fan of public-private partnerships".

Public-private partnerships are generally more expensive than publicly financed projects. This is in part due to the use of private sector financing, which comes at a higher interest rate than public financing. The CIB subsidizes this higher borrowing cost, making CIB projects more profitable for the private partners, but more expensive for taxpayers and/or users. The Bank also charges local governments for their services.

Governance

The bank's chair is a Governor in Council appointment made of the advice of the minister of infrastructure and communities. Tamara Vrooman was appointed chair on January 27, 2021. Ehren Cory is the bank's Chief Executive Officer and President, and Annie Ropar is the CIB's Chief Administrative Officer (CAO) and Chief Financial Officer (CFO).

Most of the board members are investors who had their career in major banks or pension funds. More than half of members have ties to the Liberal Party, including former Calgary mayor and past Liberal donor Dave Bronconnier.

Political scientist Heather Whiteside predicted that the board of director's private sector majority will mostly be concerned about projects' profitability, and will disregard the government's other infrastructure priorities. Indeed, in its 2022 report of the bank's operations, the House of Commons transport committee expressed concerns about the bank's decisions on which projects to fund. The report notes that many citizens believed that it did not align with the needs of their community.

Oversight 
The Bank is not subject to the government of Canada's strong accountability and transparency rules, and the Auditor General of Canada has limited oversight on the bank and its projects. Under Ehren Cory, the bank streamlined its approval process. From 2021 onwards, the federal government stopped reviewing each individual projects and began approving CIB investments by sector.

In January 2020, following numerous criticism of the Banks' operations, the House of Commons commissioned an audit of federal infrastructure projects (worth over $186.7 billion), and a complete  of Bank.

The Parliamentary Budget Office (PBO) reviewed the CIB's announcements as of April 2021, and compared them with the track record of similar institutions. It concluded that the CIB is likely to spend only $16-billions of its $35-billion total budget over the course of its 11-year mandate.

In March 2021, the Canadian House of Commons Standing Committee on Transport, Infrastructure and Communities unanimously requested that the CIB provide the committee with "all documents detailing the bonus policies and payment of bonuses to executives and the board of directors since the bank's inception". The bank's 157-page response to this request did not include the details of its executive bonuses, citing "competitive and privacy considerations". Opposition members of the committee strongly criticized the bank for this omission.

Leadership history 

Chairperson
 Janice Fukakusa (July 2017–April 2020)
 Michael Sabia (April 2020–January 2021) 
 Tamara Vrooman (January 2021 – present)

CEO
 Pierre Lavallée (May 2018–April 2020)
 Annie Ropar (Interim) (April 2020–October 2020)
 Ehren Cory (October 2020 – present)

Reception
Since its inception, the Bank received sharp criticism from public-sector unions such as the Canadian Union of Public Employees (CUPE), which characterized the CIB as a "Bank of privatization" and a "Jackpot for corporations".

According to CUPE, the CIB's structure represents a betrayal of Prime Minister Justin Trudeau's campaign promises concerning infrastructure. Campaigning in 2015, Trudeau argued that the government could fund infrastructure projects leveraging the public sector's low interest rates. Combined with his promise to run modest deficits, his rhetoric was distinctly anti-austerity. Some argue this was a bait-and-switch because the CIB is designed to promote public–private partnerships and asset recycling (the selling of existing public infrastructure to fund new projects). As such, Trudeau's "efforts to transfer public assets to private actors display a degree of finesse and deception far beyond the Conservative approach to infrastructure privatization."

After two years of operation, in 2019, the private sector was displeased by the Bank's slow pace of project approval. According to Conservative infrastructure critic Matt Jeneroux, the CIB "was supposed to be a new way to build infrastructure, but we're still faced with the same delays, and the issues of actually building infrastructure have gotten worse when we're tying up this much money in the bank."

Both the Conservative Party, led by Andrew Scheer, and the New Democratic Party (NDP), led by Jagmeet Singh, promised to wind down the CIB if they were elected to form government in the 2019 Canadian federal election. The Bloc Québécois also opposed the CIB on the grounds that any federal funds transferred to Quebec should have no strings attached. In the election, the Liberals retained government, albeit with minority status, downgraded from a previous majority government.

The opposition's displeasure with the bank continued through 2021. Conservative infrastructure critic and former leader Andrew Scheer called the CIB "a lemon of an institution" due to its failure to complete projects, while NDP infrastructure critic Taylor Bachrach criticized the bank's focus on attracting private institutional investments and argued for a return to the traditional public infrastructure funding model.

In February 2022, NDP MP Niki Ashton introduced a bill to rewrite the CIB's mandate to focus on projects that tackle the impacts of climate change, to fund publicly owned infrastructure instead of trying to involve private finance, and to invest more heavily in infrastructure in Indigenous and northern communities.

Projects

Cancelled waste and wastewater infrastructure project in Mapleton, Ontario
On July 15, 2019, the CIB made a $CDN 20 million investment commitment township of Mapleton, Ontario's water and wastewater project. The financing comes in the form of a "standardized debt financing package" to "attract private capital expertise". The Township of Mapleton, with a rural population of 11,000, has been seeking a consortium public-partnership to "design, build, finance, operate and maintain" a proposed 20-year project to improve and expand" the township's publicly owned water and wastewater infrastructure".

The CIB said that this project is a potential pilot and model which could demonstrate to Canadian municipalities—including smaller communities—with water and wastewater challenges, how CIB can assist them in attracting private sector capital" for financing to improve publicly owned water and wastewater systems. While the water and waste-water systems will continue to be publicly owned, concerns have been raised by organizations, such as the Canadian Union of Public Employees (CUPE), that there is a risk that smaller communities may become locked into lengthy agreements with private financiers that result in higher user fees for water and wastewater services.

The proposal attracted international attention due to the project financing's uniqueness. However, in August 2020, after reviewing financial analyses of the main proposals, the township opted to cancel the project instead. A report showed that self-financing the project would be more advantageous for Mapleton than using the CIB's model.

Acts
The CIB was established by the Canada Infrastructure Bank Act  (CIB Act), an Act of Parliament on June 22, 2017.

References

Federal departments and agencies of Canada
Canadian federal Crown corporations
Investment promotion agencies
Funding bodies of Canada
Government-owned banks